John Prendergast was a painter who was born in England in 1815.  He sailed from Manila to Honolulu aboard the Spanish brig Flecha, arriving January 14, 1848.  On July 15, 1848, he departed Honolulu for San Francisco aboard the Chilean brig Correo de Talcahuano.  For four years, he produced numerous drawings and watercolor paintings in California, and then disappeared from the public record.  Several lithographs were made from his paintings, the best known being his 1850 Procession at San Francisco in Celebration of the Admission of California.

The Honolulu Museum of Art and the Oakland Museum of California are among the public collections holding works by John Prendergast.

References
 Forbes, David W., Encounters with Paradise: Views of Hawaii and its People, 1778-1941, Honolulu Academy of Arts, 1992, 122-123.

External links
John Prendergast in AskArt.com
John Prendergast in the Smithsonian Art Inventories Catalog

Footnotes

19th-century American painters
19th-century American male artists
American male painters
Hawaii artists
English watercolourists
English landscape painters
Artists from San Francisco
1815 births
Year of death missing